"Baby Likes to Rock It" is a song written by Steve Ripley and Walt Richmond, and recorded by American country music group The Tractors. It was released in August 1994 as the first single from their self-titled album. The song reached number 11 on the Billboard Hot Country Singles & Tracks chart and peaked at number 8 on the RPM Country Tracks chart in Canada.

The song was rewritten as "Santa Claus Is Comin' (In a Boogie Woogie Choo Choo Train)" on the 1995 album Have Yourself a Tractors Christmas.

Music video
The music video, which features photo name checks for Jimmy Swaggart and Jerry Lee Lewis, was directed by Michael Salomon and premiered in late 1994. The video won Music Video of the Year at the Country Music Association Awards in 1995.

Awards
In 1995 The Tractors were nominated for a Grammy Award for Best Country Performance by a Duo or Group with Vocal for their performance of "Baby Likes to Rock It."

Chart performance

"Baby Likes to Rock It"

"Santa Claus Is Comin' (In a Boogie Woogie Choo Choo Train)"

References

External links 
Lyrics at babylikestorockit.com

1994 debut singles
1994 songs
The Tractors songs
Arista Nashville singles
Music videos directed by Michael Salomon